West Kirby railway station serves the town of West Kirby in Merseyside, England. The station is the terminus of the West Kirby branch line, which is one of the two branches of the Wirral Line, part of the Merseyrail network,. There is a central island platform between two terminus tracks, and two parallel sidings for out-of-use electric trains. 

A second station, terminal to a rail link to Hooton, lay to the east of the Wirral Line station, but closed in 1962.

History

Wirral line
In 1873, the Hoylake and Birkenhead Railway was authorised to construct two extensions to its lines. One was a short connecting section near to Birkenhead docks, and the other was the  extension from Hoylake to West Kirby. The station and the extension were opened on 1 April 1878 as the terminus of the Wirral Railway's route from Birkenhead Park station. The station's original signal box was built in 1886, to a London and North Western Railway (LNWR) design. This signal box was removed  and replaced in 1932. After the opening of the Mersey Railway Tunnel in 1886, carriages were operated through Birkenhead Park, every half-hour, all the way to James Street station in Liverpool. As traffic increased, the line into West Kirby was doubled, from a single track, in 1896. After a board meeting on 28 October 1895, it was decided to extend the line from Hooton, into West Kirby. The station was relocated on the western side of the original station, with an enlarged island platform and rebuilt, in 1898–9, in red brick, with a turreted clock tower and mock Tudor frontage. A further platform was constructed for the Hooton line, on the eastern side of the original station. The site of the original station was used for goods sidings. In the present day, this is the site of The Concourse, a community building operated by Wirral Metropolitan Borough Council.

In 1932, the London Midland and Scottish Railway (LMS) constructed  a new signal cabin, used jointly with the Great Western Railway (GWR), which was installed on the western side of the tracks, just beyond the end of the platform. This replaced the earlier signal box in the same place. This signal box was closed on 17 September 1994 and demolished a week later.

There was an active freight depot, until 1964, on the eastern side of the station. The freight depot occupied the triangular area between the former Wirral Railway station, which received the electrified lines, and the former Birkenhead Joint branch station. The depot was mainly used to receive coal for domestic distribution. The area occupied by the freight depot was later used for the construction of The Concourse. The West Kirby goods depot was principally served by a daily goods train along the electric line from Birkenhead, which also served goods depots at Hoylake, Moreton, and the Cadbury's factory near Leasowe.

West Kirby to Hooton line

West Kirby's station for trains from Hooton opened on 19 April 1886 when the Chester and Birkenhead Railway (C&BR) extended their line to West Kirby from Parkgate. This now meant there was a direct route from Hooton to West Kirby.

The station for the Hooton line was to the east of the current station. The station was along the alignment of what is now Orrysdale Road, between Bridge Road and Grange Road, and was equipped with a small turntable. The station was single-platformed, and a single-storey building provided passenger and parcels facilities. The station also had steam locomotive watering facilities at the southern end of the platform, and a passing loop.

The only significant train along this route was a once-daily through service, often just one or two coaches, which ran until 1939. This service was from New Brighton, via Bidston, to Hooton and Chester. The coaches were then attached to a London Euston train. A principal traffic was scholars travelling from stations along the route to the secondary schools in West Kirby.

The Birkenhead Joint branch station was effectively a separate facility to the main station on the electric lines. There was a junction between the two lines, underneath the Bridge Road overbridge. However, very few train movements connected between them.

In its final years, the almost-unused line was employed for the training of diesel multiple unit crews operating from Birkenhead and Chester via Hooton. The station closed to passengers on 17 September 1956, and closed completely on 7 May 1962. The station site is now the location for several civic buildings, and the route all the way to Hooton is now a footpath, known as The Wirral Way, which forms part of the Wirral Country Park.

LMS electrification

Through electric services commenced on 13 March 1938, when the LMS electrified the lines from Birkenhead Park to West Kirby. The service was provided by the then-new LMS electric multiple units. However, on Sunday mornings, the service was provided by the older Mersey Railway electric units which, up until that point, had only ever run from Liverpool to Birkenhead Park. The  concrete platform awning was erected, at the time of the 1938 electrification, along with a similar structure at New Brighton. However, the station building, across the end of the tracks, was left untouched from Victorian times.

Service disruptions
When the Open Golf Championship was held at the Royal Liverpool Golf Club, which is situated between West Kirby and Hoylake, in July 2006, services terminated at Hoylake station during the tournament. This was to allow competitors to cross the tracks from the practice course on one side to the championship course on the other. This caused some controversy locally, especially given the large increase in passengers during the championship.

Facilities

The station has a booking office and a drop-off point for cars, with a cycle rack for 16 bicycles and secure storage for 10 bicycles. The station is staffed, at all times during opening hours, has departure and arrival screens for passenger information, and platform CCTV. The terminus island platform has open-air seating, beneath a platform canopy, and there are two payphones on the platform. Wheelchair and pram access to the platform is straightforward, with no steps to ascend.

Much of the station building has been rented out as retail units, accessed from the public road rather than from the railway premises.

Services
Current services are every 15 minutes (Monday to Saturday daytime) to Liverpool.  At other times, trains operate every 30 minutes. These services are all provided by Merseyrail's fleet of Class 507 and Class 508 EMUs. These trains from the late '70s will be replaced by the end of 2022 by new trains manufactured by Stadler Rail, as was announced by Merseyrail in January 2017.

Gallery

References

Sources

Further reading

External links

Railway stations in the Metropolitan Borough of Wirral
DfT Category E stations
Former Wirral Railway stations
Railway stations in Great Britain opened in 1878
Railway stations in Great Britain closed in 1896
Railway stations in Great Britain opened in 1896
Railway stations served by Merseyrail